The BBC World Sport Star of the Year (formerly known as the BBC Overseas Sports Personality of the Year) is an award presented at the annual BBC Sports Personality of the Year award ceremony. The award is presented to a non-British sportsperson considered to have made the most substantial contribution to a sport in that year. The award was decided by a panel of over 30 sporting journalists. Each panellist voted for their top two choices; their first preference was awarded two points, and their second preference was awarded one point. The winning sportsperson had the most total points. In the case of a points tie, the sportsperson chosen as first preference by the most panellists is the winner. If this is also a tie the award is shared. In 2015 the public voted for this award.

The Overseas Personality award was first presented in 1960, six years after the BBC Sports Personality of the Year award was introduced. The first recipient of the award was Australian middle distance runner Herb Elliott. Since then, the award has been presented to 51 sportspersons. Swiss tennis player Roger Federer has won the award four times. American boxer Muhammad Ali and Jamaican sprinter Usain Bolt have both won the award three times. The award has been shared on three occasions—by Ron Clarke and Gary Player in 1965, Eusébio and Garfield Sobers in 1966, and Evander Holyfield and Michael Johnson in 1996. The husband-and-wife skating duo of Oleg Protopopov and Ludmila Belousova are the only pair to have won the award, doing so in 1968. Belousova was the first woman to become Overseas Personality—she was also the oldest, aged 33. George Moore is the oldest recipient of the award, winning in 1967 aged 44. The youngest recipient of the award is Nadia Comăneci, who won in 1976 at age 15. Boris Becker, who was 18 when he won in 1985, is the youngest male to have won.

Twenty-six different countries have been represented by the award winners as of 2022. United States sportspersons have won the award the most times, having had nineteen recipients, two of whom shared the award. Three cricketers have received the award -- Garfield Sobers of Barbados, Brian Lara of Trinidad and Tobago (both of whom played for the West Indies cricket team), and Shane Warne of Australia. Fourteen sporting disciplines have been represented; tennis has the highest representation, with fifteen recipients.

Only one winner has ever been stripped of the award – U.S. cyclist Lance Armstrong, whose 2003 award was rescinded following the UCI's 2012 decision to strip him of his titles and ban him for life from the sport.

In 2018, the award was renamed BBC World Sport Star of the Year. Along with the change of name, votes could be cast from outside of the UK for the first time.

Winners

By year

By nationality
This table lists the total number of awards won by place of birth.

By sport
This table lists the total number of awards won by recipient's sporting profession.

By gender
This table lists the total number of awards won by gender.

Note
 The fractions refer to occasions on which the awarded was shared between more than one person.

See also
Athlete of the Year
Laureus World Sports Award for Sportsman of the Year (Laureus World Sports Academy)
Laureus World Sports Award for Sportswoman of the Year
L'Équipe Champion of Champions

References
General

Specific

World Sport Star
Awards established in 1962